The Willys MD, formally the M38A1 Truck, Utility: 1/4 ton, 4x4, or the G758 by its U.S. Army Standard Nomenclature supply catalog designation, was a four-wheel drive, military light utility vehicle, made by Willys and Willys Motors / Kaiser Jeep from 1952 to 1971. It was widely procured by the U.S. military from 1952 until 1957, after which U.S. purchases were reduced to the U.S. Marine Corps. The Marine version had minor differences from the units used by other branches. 

The MD was the first Willys jeep with a significantly restyled body, immediately recognizable by its rounded hood and fenders. It formed the basis for the civilian and commercial Jeep CJ5, built for three decades (1954–1983), and subsequent models, and called the first 'round-fendered' Jeep.  Although hard doors were still not available, the soft-top could be complemented with soft side panels and little hinged doors, that consisted of a thin steel frame with cloth and plastic window.

For the U.S. Army, the MD was replaced by the Ford M151 jeep, from 1960. Low volume production of M38A1s for export to friendly foreign governments continued through 1971. Production totalled 101,488 units (80,290 domestic / 21,198 foreign sales). M38A1 jeeps saw extensive service during the Korean War, Vietnam War and several other conflicts.

Description

The M38A1 / MD was the second post-war evolution of the World War II Willys MB jeep (after the M38 or MC; F engine Prototypes), and the first Willys Jeep to feature the new rounded fenders and hood body design that would become the distinguishing body style of the 1955 CJ5, and which was carried through for decades on the CJ6, CJ7 and CJ8 Jeeps.

Drive Train
The M38A1 was the first Army jeep to use the Willys Hurricane F-Head 134 inline-four engine. This engine was taller than the 'Go-Devil' engine that powered the WWII era jeeps and the M38, and was the reason for restyling the body over the higher power plant. 

Otherwise, the MD had a T-90 3-speed transmission, Dana 18 transfer case, either the Dana 25 or the Dana 27 front axle, and Dana 44 rear axle.

Variants

M38A1 (MD)

Basic utility version. Would regularly be equipped with M2 .50 cal machine gun and/or radio equipment and antenna-mount. On early units (1952–1953) the front grille was mounted with two 45 degree hinges, one at each frame rail, to flip it forward for maintenance.

M38A1C
Modified version equipped with a M40A1 106mm recoilless rifle. They were fitted with a .50 caliber M8C semi-automatic spotting rifle. The spotting would be fired first, to ensure a first round hit with the 106mm recoilless rifle. The .50 caliber spotter cartridge was 22mm shorter than the standard .50 caliber machine gun cartridge. A slot was provided in the windshield frame for the 106mm barrel when traveling.

M38A1'D'
Several dozen M38A1s were converted, mounting a tactical nuclear Davy Crockett Weapon System, fired by a large diameter smoothbore recoilless rifle – either an M28 120mm, or an M29 155mm gun. The vehicle carried two M388 projectiles, mounting the Mk-54 nuclear warhead.  The range of weapon was approximately 1.25 miles (2 km), with the M28 gun, or 2.5 miles (4 km) with the M29.  This vehicle/weapon combination was also referred to as the "Battle Group Atomic Delivery System", and was allocated to airborne units.

M38A1 Welding Unit
Just one unit is assumed to have been built, originally fitted with a Harger & Valentine field arc-welding system, powered by a power take-off driven generator.

M170 ambulance
The M170 Frontline Ambulance variant of the M38A1, with a  stretched wheelbase, formed the basis for the later civilian Willys CJ6 Jeep. The spare tire was relocated in a special wheel well on the right interior side of the vehicle, and a larger  fuel tank was fitted. Capacity was six seated passengers, or three lying on litters. A total of 4,155 M170 ambulances were designed and built by Kaiser Jeep of Toledo, Ohio, from the mid-1950s to the early 1960s.

U.S. Marines
There is no official, nor uniform specification, for the M38A1s that where manufactured specifically for the United States Marine Corps. USMC jeeps had to be air transportable, hung under a helicopter, so they all had a reinforced rear bumper, for lift ring fitment, and most indeed had front and rear lift rings. The rear lift rings were fitted (by or for USMC) in a different position, than standard jeeps had been prepared for from the factory.
Further, most USMC jeeps had more waterproofing, and roughly two thirds of them received more undercoating – to the frame exterior, under the floor and hood, and the bottom half of the firewall. For better traction, the Marine Corps started ordering limited-slip differentials, especially on the rear axle, and mostly after introduction of the M151 jeeps in the Army. USMC jeeps were painted 34052 forest green, with flat yellow numbering on the hood only. Little or no other markings were applied on USMC jeeps.

U.S. Air Force DJ

Canadian 

Canadian variants: M38A1CDN, M38A1CDN2 produced in Canada and M38A1CDN3 produced in the USA.

According to Canadian author David Dunlop, over 1,000 M38A1 CDN jeeps were built by Ford of Canada in 1952/1953.
Next, Kaiser Jeep of Canada Ltd started assembling Jeeps in Windsor in 1954 or in 1959, in the former Willys factory, established there in 1934. Initially building only CJ-5 jeeps, at a targeted rate of 1,000 a year, in 1967 a Canadian government contract came, to build 800 M38A1 CDN2 Jeeps for the Canadian Forces at $2,789,000 CDN. M38A1 CDN3 jeeps were built in the USA for Canada in 1970-1971. Unclear about 1959-69 Windsor production is how many other Jeep models and units were built for the Canadian military. Anecdotal evidence has surfaced of a domestic Canadian Navy unit, built in 1964.

Dutch: NEKAF jeeps 

After initially using surplus U.S. war jeeps after World War II, a successor model was required by the Royal Netherlands Army, from the early 1950s. Wanting to support Dutch industry, a prototype four-wheel drive design by the country's only volume car and truck manufacturer DAF, the H-driven DAF YA-054, was considered, competing with U.S.-built M38A1s, a number of which had been supplied under the Mutual Defense Assistance program.

The DAF proposal seemed neither better nor cheaper and lost the race, but as an economic stimulus, the American Jeeps were to be assembled in Holland from knock-down kits parts, made in the U.S.A., in the "Netherlands Kaiser-Frazer" (NEKAF) factory. Eventually some 24 % of the NEKAF jeep's parts were supplied by Dutch firms. Nekaf jeeps were identical to U.S. M38A1s, except for minor lighting additions.

Production spanned from 1955 to 1958, under Kaiser-Frazer (some 5,650 units), after which time production was taken over by a Dutch company, who delivered another 2,237 jeeps through 1963, still using the 'NEKAF' name, for a total of just under 8,000 units. The M38A1 Jeep eventually served with one of the longest service records in the Royal Dutch military, for more than 40 years, from 1952 until 1996, as a result of both budget constraints, and sheer longevity of the vehicles, even outlasting the DKW Mungas, which had been bought to replace them in Dutch service, as well as some 1,200 DAF YA 66s supplied in the 1970s, which had little to no off-road capability, and which were decommissioned in the early 1990s.

After 1959, with American part sets, 355 Nekafs were converted to M38A1C: 106mm M40 recoilless rifle carriers, and from 1983 to 1989, forty M38A1Cs were equipped with cable-guided TOW missiles.

Iranian 
Jeep Truck copies (variously called the Simurg or Simoorgh) are produced by the firm of Sherkat-Sahami in Iran.

South Korean 
Kia KM410 and Keohwa M-5GA1 versions were produced by Kia and Keohwa, Ltd. (now SsangYong Motor) in South Korea.

Operators

: M38A1 MD and M38A1C versions used by the Bangladesh Army.
: CJ-5 and Brazilian-produced versions used by the Brazilian Army.
: M38A1 MD, M38A1Cdn, M38A1Cdn2 and M38A1Cdn3 Canadian-produced versions used by the Canadian Army.
: South Korean-produced Kia KM410 and Keohwa M-5GA1 versions used by the Chadian ground forces. 
: M38A1 MD version used by the Cuban Army during the Cuban Revolution.
: M38A1 MD and CJ-5 versions used by the Croatian National Guard during the Croatian War of Independence (19911995).
: Jeep CJ-7, Jeep CJ-8, Jeep TJ, Jeep JK, and Jeep J8 Egyptian-produced KADER versions used by the Egyptian Army.
: CJ-5 version used by the Salvadoran Army during the Salvadoran Civil War.
: Jeep CJ-7 (and Jeep J8 APV versions) used by the Armed Forces of Guatemala.
: M38A1 MD, M38A1C, and Israeli-modified versions used by the Israel Defense Forces and Israel security forces; replaced by the AIL Storm.
: M38A1 MD, M38A1C, South Korean and Iranian-produced versions used by the Islamic Republic of Iran Army Ground Forces.
: M38A1 MD and M38A1C versions used by the Jordanian Armed Forces.
: M38A1 MD version used by the Katangese Gendarmerie during the Congo Crisis.
 Kingdom of Laos: M38A1 MD version used by the Royal Lao Army during the Laotian Civil War (1954-1975).
: M38A1 MD version used by the Regional Gendarmerie and the Lebanese Armed Forces.
: Egyptian-produced Jeep TJL version. 
: M38A1 MD version used by the Myanmar Army.
: M38A1 MD and Dutch-produced NEKAF versions used by the Royal Netherlands Army.
: M38A1 MD and CJ-5 versions used by the National Guard of Nicaragua.
: M38A1 MD and M38A1C versions used by the Pakistan Army.
: M38A1 MD version used by the Portuguese Army.
 Republic of the Congo: M38A1 MD version used by the Armée Nationale Congolaise (ANC) during the Congo Crisis.
: M38A1 MD version used by the Rhodesian Security Forces.
: M38A1 MD and South Korean-produced Kia KM410 and Keohwa M-5GA1 versions.
: Captured Iranian-produced versions re-used by Spetsnaz special forces teams during the Soviet–Afghan War.
: M38A1 MD and M38A1C versions.
: M38A1 MD and M38A1C versions used by the Turkish Army.
: M38A1 MD, M38A1C, M170, USMC variant, and USAF DJ versions.
: M38A1 MD and M38A1C versions used by the Republic of China Army.

Non-state military operators
 26th of July Movement: M38A1 MD version captured from the Cuban Army.
  Afghan Mujahideen: Iranian-produced Simurg or Simoorgh variants employed during the Soviet–Afghan War.

 Al-Mourabitoun: M38A1 MD or CJ-5 versions. 
 Army of Free Lebanon (AFL): M38A1 MD or CJ-5 versions.
 Amal Movement: CJ-5 and CJ-8 versions. 
 Arab Democratic Party (Lebanon): CJ-5 and CJ-8 versions. 
 Progressive Socialist Party/ People's Liberation Army (PLA): M38A1 MD and CJ-5 and CJ-8 versions.  
 Kataeb Regulatory Forces (KRF): M38A1 MD and Israeli-modified versions. 
 Lebanese Arab Army (LAA): M38A1 MD or CJ-5 versions.
 Lebanese Forces: M38A1 MD and Israeli-modified versions, and South Korean Kia KM410 and Keohwa M-5GA1 versions.
 – Palestine Liberation Organization (PLO): M38A1 MD and CJ-5 versions used by the Palestinian guerrilla factions in Lebanon. 
 Sandinista National Liberation Front (FSLN): M38A1 MD and CJ5 versions captured from the National Guard of Nicaragua.
 South Lebanon Army (SLA): M38A1C and Israeli-modified versions. 
 Syrian Social Nationalist Party in Lebanon: CJ-5 and CJ-8 versions. 
 Tigers Militia: M38A1 MD or CJ-5 versions. 
  United Nations: M38A1 or CJ-5 versions.
Zgharta Liberation Army (a.k.a. Marada Brigade): CJ-5 and CJ-8 versions.

Service history

See also

Footnotes

Reference notes

General references

 TM 9-804A -ton 4x4 utility truck M38A1, Technical manual (1952)
 TH 9-345 NEKAF M38A1 Dutch M38A1 made by NEKAF, Technical manual (1957)
Kenneth Conboy and Don Greer, War in Laos 1954-1975, Carrollton, TX: Squadron/Signal Publications, 1994. 
Samer Kassis, 30 Years of Military Vehicles in Lebanon, Beirut: Elite Group, 2003. 
Samer Kassis, Véhicules Militaires au Liban/Military Vehicles in Lebanon 1975-1981, Trebia Publishing, Chyah 2012. 
Leigh Neville, Technicals: Non-Standard Tactical Vehicles from the Great Toyota War to modern Special Forces, New Vanguard series 257, Osprey Publishing Ltd, Oxford 2018. 
Moustafa El-Assad, Civil Wars Volume 1: The Gun Trucks, Blue Steel books, Sidon 2008. 
Philipe Naud, La Guerre Civile Libanaise - 1re partie: 1975-1978, Steelmasters Magazine, August–September 2012, pp. 8–16.  (in French)
Zachary Sex & Bassel Abi-Chahine, Modern Conflicts 2 – The Lebanese Civil War, From 1975 to 1991 and Beyond, Modern Conflicts Profile Guide Volume II, AK-interactive, 2021. ISBN 8435568306073

External links

The M38A1 Restoration Site
M38A1 on display at U.S. Veterans Memorial Museum, Huntsville, AL

Military light utility vehicles
Military trucks of the United States
Military vehicles introduced in the 1950s
Motor vehicles manufactured in the United States
Kaiser Motors
M38A1